David Williamson (born 1942) is an Australian playwright.

David Williamson may also refer to:
 David Williamson, Baron Williamson of Horton (1934–2015), British and European civil servant
 David Williamson (businessman) (born 1961), Executive Director of Operations at Newcastle United Football Club
 David Williamson (footballer) (born 1975), Hong Kong-born footballer
 David Williamson (soldier) (1752–1814), American colonel in the Pennsylvania militia during the Revolutionary War
 David Williamson (British politician) (1868–1955), British editor and politician
 David G. Williamson, British historian
 David P. Williamson, professor of operations research at Cornell University
 David Williamson, Lord Balgray (1761–1837), Senator of the College of Justice in Scotland
 David Theodore Nelson Williamson (1923–1992), British electronics engineer
 David Williamson (magician) (born 1961), stage magician
 David Williamson (minister) (c1634–1706), Scottish minister and Covenanter
 Dave Williamson, stand-up comedian

See also
 David Williamson Carroll (1816–1905), Arkansas politician
 Davy Williamson (born 1979), American musician